Nolidae is a family of moths with about 1,700 described species worldwide. They are mostly small with dull coloration, the main distinguishing feature being a silk cocoon with a vertical exit slit. The group is sometimes known as tuft moths, after the tufts of raised scales on the forewings of two subfamilies, Nolinae and Collomeninae. The larvae also tend to have muted colors and tufts of short hairs.

Formerly, this group was included in the Noctuidae.

Subfamilies
 Chloephorinae
 Collomeninae
 Eligminae
 Nolinae
 Risobinae

Monotypic subfamilies
 Afridinae – Afrida
 Bleninae – Blenina
 Diphtherinae – Diphthera (monotypic genus)
 Eariadinae – Earias
 Westermanniinae – Westermannia

Genera incertae sedis 
The following genera have yet to be assigned to a subfamily:

References

Bibliography

External links
Images of Nolidae species in New Zealand

 
Moth families
Taxa named by George Hampson